Ceratozamia robusta is a species of plant in the family Zamiaceae. It is found in Belize, Guatemala, and Mexico (in Chiapas, Oaxaca, and Veracruz).  Its natural habitat is subtropical or tropical moist lowland forests. It is threatened by habitat loss.

References

robusta
Flora of Belize
Flora of Guatemala
Flora of Chiapas
Flora of Oaxaca
Flora of Veracruz
Endangered plants
Endangered biota of Mexico
Taxonomy articles created by Polbot